Achim Hollerieth (born 24 September 1973) is a German former professional footballer who played as a goalkeeper.

Playing career
Hollerieth started out as a forward and only became a goalkeeper in a U18 team.

He spent three seasons in the 2. Bundesliga with KFC Uerdingen 05. During this time, he was voted best goalkeeper of the league in the 1998–99 season.

Hollerieth's performances for Uerdingen earned him a move to Bundesliga club VfB Stuttgart where he was understudy to Franz Wohlfahrt.

He left VfB Stuttgart after one season joining Waldhof Mannheim on a three-year contract.

In 2008 he had an unsuccessful trial with FC Augsburg.

Coaching career
In March 2020 Hollerieth left Oberliga Niedersachsen club TB Uphusen mid-season to join Regionalliga Nord side FC Teutonia Ottensen citing his personal and job situation. In April 2021 he left Teutonia Ottensen.

References

External links
 

1973 births
Living people
People from Pfullendorf
Sportspeople from Tübingen (region)
German footballers
Association football goalkeepers
Bundesliga players
2. Bundesliga players
Swiss Challenge League players
KFC Uerdingen 05 players
VfB Stuttgart players
SV Waldhof Mannheim players
SSV Reutlingen 05 players
FC St. Pauli players
SV 19 Straelen players
VfB Lübeck players
FC Schaffhausen players
German football managers
German expatriate footballers
German expatriate sportspeople in Switzerland
Expatriate footballers in Switzerland
Footballers from Baden-Württemberg